Dörrmoschel is a municipality in the Donnersbergkreis district, in Rhineland-Palatinate, Germany. Dörrmoschel has an area of 2.88 km² and a population of 150 (as of December 31, 2020).

References

Municipalities in Rhineland-Palatinate
Donnersbergkreis